Anders Olof Tage Johnson (25 March 1878 – 30 September 1950) was a Swedish rower who competed in the 1912 Summer Olympics.

He was the bowman of the Swedish boat Göteborgs which was eliminated in the quarter finals of the men's coxed fours, inriggers tournament.

References

1878 births
1950 deaths
Swedish male rowers
Olympic rowers of Sweden
Rowers at the 1912 Summer Olympics